Virginia's 10th congressional district is a U.S. congressional district in the Commonwealth of Virginia. It is currently represented by Democrat Jennifer Wexton, who was first elected in 2018.

The district includes all of Rappahannock County, Fauquier County, and Loudoun County, parts of Fairfax County and Prince William County, as well as the independent cities of Manassas, Manassas Park.  The district closely matches Virginia's voting patterns in statewide races with nearly identical margins as the final statewide results.

Beginning when it was re-created in 1952, the 10th district was in Republican hands for 60 of 66 years, including long stints in office by Joel Broyhill (1953–74) and Frank Wolf (1981-2014). Barbara Comstock, a former aide to Wolf, succeeded him after the 2014 election. Wexton defeated Comstock in the 2018 midterms, becoming only the second Democrat to win it.

As of 2022, VA-10 is the third-wealthiest Congressional district in the country, with a median income of $140,889.

Demographics
According to Larry Sabato's Crystal Ball, this district has many "wealthy and highly-educated voters" as of 14 April 2016. Specifically, whites represent about 61% of the population, and immigrants (largely Hispanic and Asian) represent over 20%. Just over half of adults hold at least a four-year college degree. The median income is $120,384.

The 10th district has 35,500 federal workers. By comparison, the 1st district has 46,900; the 11th has 51,900; and the 8th has 81,100. The eastern part of the district is home to Dulles Airport and technology, telecom and aerospace companies including Verizon Business Global LLC and Aeronautical Systems Inc.

History
The modern 10th congressional district was formed in 1952. For the next two decades, it consisted of Arlington, Alexandria and most of Fairfax County. As a result of redistricting following the 1970 census, it lost Alexandria and was pushed westward to take in Loudoun County. Joel T. Broyhill had represented it since its creation, but lost in the 1974 wave to Democrat Joseph L. Fisher. Fisher held the seat for three terms before losing to Republican Frank Wolf in 1980. Wolf easily held the seat until his retirement in 2014. That year, the seat was won by fellow Republican Barbara Comstock, a state delegate and former aide to Wolf. Comstock served for two terms before losing to Democratic State Senator Jennifer Wexton in 2018.

Voting
Virginia's 10th congressional district used to be a Republican stronghold, having once voted by double-digit margins for Republican candidates. In 2000, ten-term incumbent Republican Congressman Frank Wolf won over 80% of the vote and did not face a Democratic opponent. Two years later, Wolf defeated his Democratic challenger John Stevens by 43 points. In 2004, President George W. Bush won the district by 11 points. In recent years, the district has become much friendlier to Democrats due to population growth in the Washington, D.C. suburbs. In 2012, Mitt Romney narrowly carried the district by a point, while in 2016, Hillary Clinton won the district by 10 points.

In 2017, Democrats scored major gains in the state legislative elections, leaving Comstock as the only elected Republican above the county level in much of the district. Ralph Northam also easily carried the district in the gubernatorial race. This proved to be a precursor to Comstock's defeat by Wexton a year later.

Recent election results

1970s

1980s

1990s

2000s

2010s

2020s

List of members representing the district

Historical district boundaries

See also

Virginia's congressional districts
List of United States congressional districts
Virginia's 10th congressional district election, 2018

References

 Congressional Biographical Directory of the United States 1774–present

External links
VA Democratic 10th CD website
 VA Republican 10th CD website

10
Constituencies established in 1789
1789 establishments in Virginia
Constituencies disestablished in 1863
1863 disestablishments in Virginia
Constituencies established in 1885
1885 establishments in Virginia
Constituencies disestablished in 1933
1933 disestablishments in Virginia
Constituencies established in 1953
1953 establishments in Virginia